Ingrid Föst ( Michaelis; born 9 November 1934) is a retired German gymnast. She competed at the 1960 and 1964 Summer Olympics in all artistic gymnastics events and finished in sixth and fourth place with the German team, respectively. Individually her best achievement was fifth place on the floor in 1964. She won one silver and five bronze medals at the European championships of 1959 and 1961.

References

1934 births
Living people
Gymnasts at the 1960 Summer Olympics
Gymnasts at the 1964 Summer Olympics
Olympic gymnasts of the United Team of Germany
German female artistic gymnasts
20th-century German women
21st-century German women